Review of General Psychology is the quarterly scientific journal of the American Psychological Association Division 1: The Society for General Psychology. The journal publishes cross-disciplinary psychological articles that are conceptual, theoretical, and methodological in nature. Other aspects include the evaluation and integration of research literature and the providing of historical analysis. The journal was established in 1997. The editor-in-chief is Wade E. Pickren (Independent Scholar, USA) and Thomas Teo (York University, Canada).

Abstracting and indexing
According to the Journal Citation Reports, the journal has a 2018 impact factor of 2.786.

See also
 List of psychology journals

References

External links

Psychology journals
American Psychological Association academic journals
Quarterly journals
Publications established in 1997
English-language journals